Jeanne Carolyn Cagney (March 25, 1919 – December 7, 1984) was an American film, stage, and television actress.

Early years
Born in New York City, Cagney and her four older brothers were raised by her widowed mother Carolyn Elizabeth Cagney (née Nelson). Two of her brothers were film actor James Cagney and actor/producer William Cagney. She attended Hunter College High School. Majoring in French and German, she was a cum laude graduate of Hunter College (now part of City University of New York)  and a member of Phi Beta Kappa Society. She also starred in plays produced by the college's dramatic society. Following her college graduation, she studied acting at the Pasadena Playhouse.

Stage

Cagney performed in the original stage production of The Iceman Cometh, which premiered on Broadway on October 9, 1946.  The play's author, Eugene O'Neill, cast her in the role of Margie, one of the "street walkers" in his story.

Film

After being heard by a scout while appearing on Bing Crosby's radio program, Cagney had a film test with RKO Pictures. However, she signed a long-term contract with Paramount Pictures. She appeared in 19 films between 1939 and 1965, including four films with her brother James: Yankee Doodle Dandy (1942), The Time of Your Life (1948), A Lion Is in the Streets (1953), and Man of a Thousand Faces (1957). Cagney gave a noted performance opposite Mickey Rooney in the film noir crime film Quicksand (1950).

Radio
Cagney briefly played the title role in the radio soap opera The Romance of Helen Trent.  Most of her other work on radio was as a guest in dramatic programs such as the following:

Television
In 1954, Cagney made a television pilot for a mystery series, Satan's Waiting, but it apparently was not sold.  Later, she served as the fashion commentator of Queen for a Day, hosted by Jack Bailey on NBC and ABC from 1956 to 1963. This daytime "game show"  is regarded as a forerunner of today's reality shows. Cagney hosted segments that provided viewers with tips on style and introduced to them the latest fashions.

Family
Cagney married actor Ross Latimer (also known as Kim Spalding) in 1944. She was divorced from him March 9, 1951. They had no children. She married Jack Morrison, a faculty member in theater arts at UCLA, on June 6, 1953; they had two daughters, Mary and Terry.

Death
Cagney, at age 65, died of lung cancer in Newport Beach, California, on December 7, 1984. Her grave is at Pacific View Memorial Park in Corona del Mar, California.

Filmography

References

External links

 
 
 
 

1919 births
1984 deaths
Actresses from New York City
American radio actresses
American film actresses
American television actresses
Burials at Pacific View Memorial Park
Deaths from lung cancer in California
20th-century American actresses
Hunter College alumni